Consider This is a daily afternoon news podcast by the American media organization NPR, which typically releases new episodes Monday through Saturday around 5 p.m. ET.

Background 
Consider This originated as a continuation of NPR's Coronavirus Daily podcast., which had published since March 2020. By June 29 of that year, the podcast adopted its current name and broadened its scope to cover a variety of national news topics, with its focus on facets of a single story in each episode. The podcast is also a complement to NPR's flagship afternoon news program All Things Considered, with which it shares hosts including Ailsa Chang, Mary Louise Kelly, and Ari Shapiro. Early episodes were also hosted by Embedded host Kelly McEvers and then-ATC co-host Audie Cornish. A Saturday edition was added on January 8, 2022, with episodes hosted by Weekend All Things Considered host Michel Martin.

By September 2020, NPR began augmenting its national content for Consider This with contributions from NPR member stations in ten selected markets. As of June 2022, local stories are currently produced by member stations in Boston (WBUR and WGBH); Chicago (WBEZ); Dallas/Fort Worth (KERA); Los Angeles (KPCC and KCRW); Minneapolis/St. Paul (MPR); New York (WNYC); Philadelphia (WHYY); Portland, Oregon (OPB); San Francisco (KQED); and Washington, DC (WAMU). The ten regions are intended as a pilot group, which NPR plans to expand in the future. 

Arun Rath from GBH and Paris Alston from WBUR host the local news in Boston. Rebeca Ibarra was the producer and host of the New York edition of the show in 2020. Janae Pierre is the producer and host of the New York edition of the show. NPR partnered with AdsWizz to provide local reporting the same way that localized advertising is done and uses designated market areas provided by Nielsen Media Research.

References

External links 

 
 

Audio podcasts
2020 podcast debuts
Political podcasts
News podcasts
American journalism
WNYC Studios programs
NPR programs
American podcasts